Andrea Barosci is a Hungarian sprint canoer who competed in the late 1990s. She won three medals at the ICF Canoe Sprint World Championships with two silvers (K-4 500 m: 1997, 1998) and a bronze (K-2 1000 m: 1999).

References

Hungarian female canoeists
Living people
Year of birth missing (living people)
ICF Canoe Sprint World Championships medalists in kayak